The English language name Bruce arrived in Scotland with the Normans, from the place name Brix, Manche in Normandy, France, meaning "the willowlands". Initially promulgated via the descendants of king Robert the Bruce (1274−1329), it has been a Scottish surname since medieval times; it is now a common given name.

The variant Lebrix and Le Brix are French variations of the surname.

Actors
 Bruce Bennett (1906–2007), American actor and athlete
 Bruce Boxleitner (born 1950), American actor
 Bruce Campbell (born 1958), American actor, director, writer, producer and author
 Bruce Davison (born 1946), American actor and director
 Bruce Dern  (born 1936), American actor
 Bruce Gray (1936–2017), American-Canadian actor
 Bruce Greenwood  (born 1956), Canadian actor and musician
 Bruce Herbelin-Earle (born 1998), English-French actor and model
 Bruce Jones (born 1953), English actor
 Bruce Kirby (1925–2021), American actor
 Bruce Lee (1940–1973), martial artist and movie star
 Bruce Lester (1912–2008), English actor
 Bruce McCulloch (born 1961), Canadian actor and comedian
 Bruce McGill (born 1950), American actor
 Bruce Payne, English actor
 Bruce Spence (born 1945), New Zealander-Australian actor
 Bruce Willis (born 1955), American actor

Musicians
 Bruce Abel (1936–2021), American singer
 Bruce Cockburn (born 1945), Canadian guitarist, singer-songwriter, and author
 Bruce Dickinson (born 1958), English singer, songwriter, writer, and brewer
 Bruce Guthro (born 1961), Canadian singer-songwriter
 Bruce Hornsby (born 1954), American singer-songwriter and pianist
 Bruce Johnston (born 1942), American musician, singer, songwriter, arranger, and record producer
 Bruce Kulick (born 1953), American musician
 Bruce Levingston, American concert pianist
 Bruce Molsky, (born 1955), American multi-instrumentalist and singer
 Bruce Springsteen (born 1949), American singer-songwriter, and musician
 Bruce Welch (born 1941), English guitarist, songwriter, and producer

Sports
 Bruce Arena (born 1951), American national soccer coach
 Bruce Arians (born 1952), American football head coach
 Bruce Bennett (1943–2021), American football player
 Bruce Bochte (born 1950), American baseball player
 Bruce Bochy (born 1955), American retired baseball team manager and player
 Bruce Bolden (born 1963), American basketball player
 Bruce Bowen (born 1971) American basketball player
 Bruce Boudreau (born 1955), Canadian hockey player and coach
 Bruce Carter (American football) (born 1988), American football player
 Bruce Chen (born 1977), Panamanian professional baseball pitcher
 Bruce Claridge (died 1999), Canadian football player
 Bruce Dalrymple (born 1964), American basketball player
 Bruce Dombolo (born 1985), French footballer
 Bruce Fleisher (born 1948), American professional golfer
 Bruce Gamble (1938–1982), Canadian professional ice hockey goalie
 Bruce Grobbelaar (born 1957), Zimbabwean football goalkeeper and manager
 Bruce Hector (born 1994), American football player
 Bruce Holmes (born 1965), American football player
 Bruce Irons (born 1979), American surfer
 Bruce Irvin (born 1987), American football player
 Bruce Jankowski (born 1949), American football player
 Bruce Jenner (now Caitlyn Jenner; born 1949), Olympic gold medalist, auto racer, businessperson, television personality
 Bruce Kent (cyclist) (1928–1979), New Zealander cyclist 
 Bruce LaSane (born 1967), American football player
 Bruce Manson (born 1956), American tennis player
 Bruce McCray (born 1963), American football player
 Bruce McLaren (1937–1970), New Zealander race car driver and designer, Founder of McLaren
 Bruce McPhail (1937–2020), New Zealander rugby union player
 Bruce Pandolfini (born 1947), American chess author, teacher, and coach
 Bruce Reid (born 1963) is a former Australian Test cricketer
 Bruce Reid Sr. (1929–1955), Footscray VFL footballer
 Bruce Reid Jr. (born 1955), Footscray and Carlton VFL footballer
 Bruce K. Reid (1950–1970), South Melbourne VFL footballer
 Bruce Reid (doctor) (1946–2020), Hawthorn VFL footballer and Essendon club doctor
 Bruce Seldon (born 1967), American boxing heavyweight and world champion
 Bruce Smith (halfback) (1920–1967), American football player
 Bruce Smith (Australian footballer) (born 1944), Australian rules footballer
 Bruce Smith (cricketer) (born 1946), New Zealand cricketer
 Bruce Smith (Canadian football) (1949–2013), Canadian football player
 Bruce Smith (luger) (born 1958), Canadian luger
 Bruce Smith (rugby union) (born 1959), New Zealand rugby union player
 Bruce Smith (born 1963), American football player
 Bruce Sutter (1953–2022), American baseball pitcher
 Bruce Tasker (born 1987), bobsledder

Other professions
 Bruce Allen (disambiguation), multiple people
 Bruce Angrave (1914–1983), British poster artist, illustrator and author
 Bruce Bawer (born 1956), American author and cultural critic
 Bruce Berman (born 1952), American film producer
 Bruce G. Blair (1947–2020), American nuclear security expert, research scholar, author, and TV producer
 Bruce W. Carr (1924–1998), American flying ace during World War II
 Bruce W. Carter (1950–1969), American Marine killed during the Vietnam War, awarded Medal of Honor
 Bruce Conner (1933–2008), American artist and filmmaker
 Bruce Forsyth (1928–2017), English TV host and entertainer
 Bruce Fuchs, American immunologist and health science administrator
 Bruce Gowers (1940–2023), British television director and producer
 Bruce Gray (1956–2019), American sculptor
 Bruce Kent (1929–2022), British political activist and priest
 Bruce Lander (born 1946), Judge of the Federal Court of Australia
 Bruce George Peter Lee (born 1960), prolific British serial killer, arsonist, and mass murderer
 Bruce Lerman, American cardiologist; Chief of the Division of Cardiology and Director of the Cardiac Electrophysiology Laboratory at Weill Cornell Medicine and the New York Presbyterian Hospital
 Bruce Lindahl (1953–1981), American serial killer
 Bruce Marks (born 1957), American politician
 Thomas Donald Bruce McArthur (born 1951), Canadian serial killer; better known as Bruce McArthur
 Bruce McCall (born 1935), Canadian author and illustrator
 Bruce Mendenhall (born 1951), American suspected serial killer
 Bruce Morrow ("Cousin Brucie"), American radio personality
 Bruce Montgomery (disambiguation), multiple people
 Bruce Nauman (born 1941), American artist
 Bruce Nestande (1938–2020), American politician
 Bruce Jeffrey Pardo, American mass murderer and perpetrator of the 2009 Covina massacre
 Bruce Parry (born 1969), English explorer, author, indigenous rights advocate and documentarian
 Bruce Perens, computer programmer, open source founder
 Bruce Rauner (born 1957), American businessman and politician 
 Bruce Reid (politician) (1935–2020), Australian Liberal Party politician 
 Bruce Ritchie (born 1965), British property developer
 Bruce Rockowitz (born 1958/59), American businessman
 Bruce Sterling, American science fiction writer
 Bruce Schneier (born 1963), cryptographer, computer security professional, privacy specialist and writer
 Bruce Thorburn, from the Hooley Dooleys
 Bruce Vento (1940–2000), American politician
 Bruce Weber (born 1946), American fashion photographer and filmmaker
 Bruce Webster, American software engineer, educator, and author
 Bruce West (1939–2021), American artist
 Bruce Westerman (born 1967), American politician
 Bruce Prichart Western (born 1964), American sociologist
 Bruce Wilcox (born 1951), American programmer

Fictional characters
 Bruce, one of the Delightful Children From Down The Lane on Codename: Kids Next Door
 Bruce, a great white shark in Finding Nemo
 Bruce, a replica of the shark from the 1975 film Jaws displayed at the Academy Museum of Motion Pictures, the nickname given by the film crew to the prop sharks
 The Bruces, from the Monty Python Bruces sketch
 Bruce Banner, the alter ego of the Hulk
 Bruce Ben-Bacharach, the main character's manager in Lady Dynamite
 "The Bruce Dickinson", from the SNL More Cowbell sketch
 Bruce Hyena, a supporting character in the Geronimo Stilton book franchise 
 Bruce Irvin, a Muay Thai kickboxer and fictional character from the Tekken series
 Bruce McKenzie, effeminate minor character in Family Guy
 Bruce Nolan, a reporter who is offered a chance to be God for a week in Bruce Almighty 
 Bruce Sato, from the cartoon M.A.S.K.
 Bruce Wayne, a billionaire and the secret identity of Batman
 Bruce, a penguin-like species on the virtual pet website Neopets. It was named after Bruce Forsyth.

See also
 Bruce (surname), people with surname Bruce
 Bruce Nuclear Generating Station, a Canadian nuclear reactor facility
 Bruce, Australian Capital Territory, a suburb of the Belconnen district of Canberra

References

Masculine given names
English masculine given names
Scottish masculine given names